The MTV Europe Music Award for Best Pop was first presented in 1998. British girl group the Spice Girls were the first ever act to receive the award. American singer Britney Spears was the first solo female artist to win the award in 1999, while American singer Justin Timberlake was the first male solo artist to win in 2003. South Korean boy group BTS are the first Kpop act to be nominated in this category in 2020. British boy band One Direction are currently the act with the most award wins in this category, receiving a total of three.

Winners and nominees
Winners are listed first and highlighted in bold.

† indicates an MTV Video Music Award for Best Pop Video–winning artist.
‡ indicates an MTV Video Music Award for Best Pop Video–nominated artist that same year.

1990s

2000s

2010s

2020s

Statistics
As of 2018.

See also
 MTV Video Music Award for Best Pop Video

References

MTV Europe Music Awards
Pop music awards
Awards established in 1998